This page is an incomplete list of orbital rocket engine data and specifications.

Current, Upcoming, and In-Development rocket engines

Retired and canceled rocket engines

See also 
 Comparison of orbital launch systems
 Comparison of orbital launchers families
 Comparison of crewed space vehicles
 Comparison of space station cargo vehicles
 Comparison of solid-fuelled orbital launch systems
 List of space launch system designs
 List of orbital launch systems

Notes

References

Spaceflight
Technological comparisons
Space lists
Rocket engines